Windmill Point Light may refer to:
Windmill Point Light (Michigan), in Detroit, Michigan
Windmill Point Light (Vermont), in Lake Champlain
Windmill Point Light (Virginia), in the Chesapeake Bay
Windmill Point Light (Ontario), in Prescott, Ontario, Canada